Events organized for, or largely attended by, members of Neopagan spiritual paths: often planned around the Wheel of the Year or coinciding with adjacent phases of the Moon.

Festivals
 Council of Magickal Arts
 Faerieworlds
 Free Spirit Gathering, ongoing since 1985
 Hekate's Sickle Festival, ongoing since 1989
 Mėnuo Juodaragis, ongoing since 1995
 Pagan Pride Day, held annually at many locations
 Pagan Spirit Gathering, ongoing since 1980
 Pan Pagan Festival, ongoing since 1976
 Spring Mysteries Festival, ongoing since 1986
 Starwood Festival, ongoing since 1981
 Wellspring Gathering

Defunct
 Beltania, final gathering in 2019 
 Gnosticon, final gathering in 1976

See also

 Pagan festivals in the United States
 Lists of festivals –  list articles on Wikipedia
 List of modern pagan temples

References

Lists of religious festivals
 
Modern paganism-related lists